Ted's Montana Grill is an American restaurant chain. The company was founded by media mogul and bison rancher Ted Turner along with restaurateur George McKerrow Jr. with the help of corporate chef Chris Raucci as a for-profit effort to stop the extinction of the American bison. The first Ted's Montana Grill opened in January 2002 in Columbus, Ohio.  Today it has 39 restaurants in 16 states.  Its first Montana location opened at the Baxter Hotel in Bozeman in June 2008. The company is based in Atlanta.

All bison served is National Bison Association-certified; the menu includes several other kinds of meats and vegetables. As part of the restaurant's unusual but aggressive approach to environmentalism, it "re-introduced the paper straw" which has not been produced in the United States since 1970 to avoid using plastic. They have also eco-friendly bathrooms, using dual flush toilets and eco-friendly soap.  
The restaurants routinely use $1 coins and $2 bills when they give change to customers.

On November 15, 2010, Ted's Montana Grill abruptly exited the Kansas City market, closing its three area restaurants. On that same date a total of nine Ted's Montana Grill restaurants nationwide closed. The chain closed its two Wichita, Kansas locations, its only Nebraska location, which was in Omaha, and its only Raleigh, North Carolina location. It also closed one restaurant in the Chicago area and one in the Washington, D.C. area.

Locations

References

External links
Official website

Restaurant chains in the United States
Companies based in Atlanta
Restaurants in Georgia (U.S. state)
Restaurants established in 2002

2002 establishments in Ohio